Appropriate may refer to
Appropriate (play), a play by Branden Jacobs-Jenkins
Appropriation may refer to:
Appropriation (art) the use of pre-existing objects or images with little or no transformation
Appropriation (law) as a component of government spending
 Appropriation of knowledge
Appropriation (sociology) in relation to the spread of knowledge
Appropriation (ecclesiastical) of the income of a benefice
Cultural appropriation, the borrowing of an element of cultural expression of one group by another
Reappropriation, the use with a sense of pride (of a negative word or object) by a member of the offended group 
Original appropriation, origination of human ownership of previously unowned natural resources such as land

Other terms include:
The personality rights tort of appropriation, one form of invasion of privacy
Appropriation (By Any Other Name), by The Long Blondes (2005)

See also
Appropriation Act
Appropriation bill
Appropriations bill (United States)